Alexander Hicks may refer to:
 Alexander Hicks (sociologist)
 Alexander Hicks (politician)
 Alex Hicks, Canadian ice hockey player